The Sierra de La Culata is a mountain range in the largest massif in Venezuela, the Cordillera de Mérida, which in turn is part of the northern extent of the Cordillera de los Andes (Andes Mountains). The Sierra la Culata includes some of the highest peaks in Venezuela, such as Pico Piedras Blancas, Pico Pan de Azúcar, and Collado del Cóndor.

It is located between the states of Mérida and Trujillo. Most of the lagoons are a result of the Mérida glaciation.

The Sierra La Culata National Park is a protected area within the range.

Gallery

See also

Merida glaciation
Sierra Nevada de Merida

External links
 Schubert, Carlos (1998) "Glaciers of Venezuela" United States Geological Survey (USGS P 1386-I)

Mountain ranges of Venezuela
Mountain ranges of the Andes
Geography of Mérida (state)